Echo Peaks consists of nine peaks, in the Tuolumne Meadows region of Yosemite National Park, California. They are near Echo Ridge.

John Muir and Echo Peaks

John Muir passed by Echo Peaks, writing about it in The Yosemite, sometime during or before 1912.

The area

Echo Peaks are near all of Budd Lake, Cathedral Lakes, Cathedral Peak, Cockscomb, Elizabeth Lake, Matthes Crest, Tresidder Peak and Unicorn Peak.

Rock climbing

Echos Peaks have rock climbing. Among rock climbers, Echo Peaks are popular, offering class 2-5 climbs on the nine peaklets.

References

External links 

 A topographic map of the area
 On the Cathedral Range solo traverse, which climbs Echo Peaks
 A YouTube on Echo Ridge and Echo Peaks
 A second YouTube, Echo peaks - Yosemite
 A third YouTube, a view from the highest of the Echo Peaks
 A fourth YouTube, Echo Peak, Yosemite: Sep '17

Mountains of Yosemite National Park